Moidul Islam Khan Shuvo is a Bangladeshi singer/songwriter also known as dRockstar Shuvo. His popular songs include "NitolPaye" (featuring Fuad), "Amar Shona Bondhu", "DakeShopno (Shadhin)". He has toured the US, India, Sri Lanka and Nepal.

Career 

He joined Metal Maze, in the late 1990s. In 2000 he left and formed a band named Roots. They won “Best Band” in Benson & Hedges Star Search 2003. He was the champion of "D Rock stars" in 2006, the first televised star search in Bangladesh.

He was the Brand Ambassador of Djuice — a youth brand of GrameenphoneLimited from March 2006 to April 2007.

His first rock solo album was Shuvo's Rockers, Inc.. He later joined the Bangladeshi band Fuad and Friends. Their album Kromannoy showcases Fuad's vocals. In 2008 he won the first South Asian Superstar regional competition organized by TV South Asia in Delhi.

In 2011, released the album OnekKichu, which contained acclaimed singles "Amar Shona Bondhu" and "DakeShopno".

His third solo album, OnekShopno, was released in 2014.

Two of his audio album including Shuvo’s Rockers, Inc. were sponsored and promoted by DJuice in 2008. The album Bappa with Rockers, to which he contributed, was sponsored by Brac Bank Limited in 2009.

Cricket

Cricket is a popular sport in Bangladesh. To demonstrate support for the Bangladeshi cricket team, singers Moidul Islam Khan, Shuvo, Shafi Mondol, Chandana Majumder, Jakia Sultana Tumpa, Adnan and Amjad Hossain made the music video Ora Aschee. The lyrics of the song were penned by Shuvo and Mehedi, while the composition was done by Amjad. Visual production was done by Prekkhagriho.

Songs
 NitolPaye Live version (Tagged with the band Fuad n Friends)
 Amar Shona Bondhu
 Dakeshopno (Shadhin)
 Janina (Tumiarnei she tumi)
 Akash
 Mon Pagla
 VulJanalay (from the album Bappa with Rockers)
 Klantir Sohor

References

1982 births
Living people
Bangladeshi male musicians
21st-century Bangladeshi male singers
21st-century Bangladeshi singers
Bangladeshi pop singers